Hyojong of Joseon (3 July 1619 – 23 June 1659) was the seventeenth king of the Joseon Dynasty of Korea from 1649 to 1659. He is best known for his plan for an expedition to the Manchu Qing dynasty, and his campaigns against the Russian Empire at the request of the Qing dynasty. His plan for the northern expedition was never put into action since he died before the campaign started.

Biography

Birth and background
King Hyojong was born in 1619 as the second son of King Injo, while his father was still a prince. In 1623, when the Westerners faction (西人) launched a coup that removed then-ruling Gwanghaegun and crowned Injo, Hyojong was called to the palace along with his father and given the title Bongrimdaegun (Grand Prince Bongrim) in 1626.

Captive of the Qing dynasty
In 1627, King Injo's hard-line diplomatic policy brought war between Joseon Korea and the Later Jin dynasty. Later, in 1636, the Later Jin's successor state, Qing dynasty, defeated Joseon, and King Injo pledged his loyalty to the Qing emperor at Samjeondo, bowing down at Hong Taiji's feet nine times. There, Injo and Hong Taiji signed a treaty, which included that the Qing dynasty would take Crown Prince Sohyeon, Injo's oldest son, and Hyojong to China as captive.

During his exile in China, Hyojong mostly tried to defend his older brother from the threats of the Qing dynasty. Hong Taiji and his Qing forces were still at war against the Ming dynasty and also engaged in battle with the Mongols and Chinese Muslims; and many times, the Qing emperor requested Prince Sohyeon to go to the battlefield and help command troops against the Qing's enemies. However, Hyojong was worried about his brother because he was the official heir to the throne of Joseon and had no military experience. He went on to fight the Ming loyalists in his brother's place, and he also followed Sohyeon to battles against the Uyghurs and Muslims on the western front.

Along with his brother, he made contact with Europeans while he was in China; and also he learned that Joseon needed to develop new technology and a stronger political and military system in order to protect itself from foreign powers. He also developed a grudge against Qing dynasty, which separated him from his home country and his family. It was during this period that he decided to make a massive plan for northern campaigns against the Qing dynasty, an act of vengeance on the Qing dynasty for the war of 1636.

Enthronement
In 1645, Crown Prince Sohyeon returned to Joseon alone, in order to succeed Injo to the throne and to help Injo to govern the nation. However, he often came into conflict with Injo, who disliked Sohyeon's open view of European culture and diplomatic views of the Qing dynasty. Soon he was found dead at the King's room, and buried quickly after a short funeral. Later, Injo also executed Sohyeon's wife who tried to find out the real reason for her husband's death. Legends say that Injo killed his own son with an ink slab that the Crown Prince brought from China.

Rather than selecting Crown Prince Sohyeon's oldest son, Prince Suk Chul, as the next royal successor, Injo selected Grand Prince Bong Rim and gave him the title of Crown Prince.  When King Injo died in 1649, Hyojong inherited the throne, becoming the 17th monarch of Joseon.

Northern campaigns
After rising to the throne, he began to reform and expand the military of Korea; first he removed Kim Ja-jeom, who had corrupted politics and had greater power than the king himself. Then, he called Song Si-yeol (Hangul: 송시열 Hanja :宋時烈) and Kim Sang-heon to his court, who supported war against the Qing Dynasty. His military expansion was massive, and he also built several border fortresses along Yalu River where Joseon and Qing shared a border. When a band of Dutch sailors including Hendrick Hamel drifted on Jeju Island, Hyojong ordered them to build muskets for the army, providing muskets to the Koreans for the first time after the Seven Year War.

However, the Qing dynasty continued to thrive, expanding quickly into the west after successfully conquering the Ming in 1644. The campaign was unable to be put in action, since the Qing dynasty assimilated the massive Han army into their own. The Joseon military, although reformed and expanded, was no match against the combined Manchu and Han forces. Also, the Qing dynasty began to treat Joseon as its friend and closest ally.

The expanded military was first put into action in 1654, when the Qing dynasty called for help to fight against invading Russians. 150 Joseon musketeers, along with 3,000 Manchus, met the Russian army at the Battle of Hutong (Hangul : 호통 Hanja : 好通), present-day Yilan, which was won by the Qing–Joseon allied forces. Four years later, in 1658, Hyojong sent troops once again to help Qing dynasty against Russia; 260 Joseon musketeers and cannoneers led by Shin Ryu joined the forces of Ninguta Military Governor Sarhuda, the joint force sailed down the Hurka and Sungari Rivers and met the Russian forces under command of an Amur Cossack, Onufrij Stepanov near the fall of the Sungari River into the Amur, killing 270 Russians and driving them out of Qing territory. The battles against Russia proved that Hyojong's reform had stabilized the Joseon army, although they were never put into action again. Despite the campaigns, Russia and Joseon remained on good terms. The Northern campaign is known as Naseon Jeongbeol (Hangul: 나선정벌  Hanja : 羅禪征伐), or "Suppression of the Russians").

Other accomplishments
During his reign, many books about farming were published to promote agriculture, which had been devastated during the Seven Year War. Hyojong also continued Gwanghaegun's reconstructions; he had a hard time restoring the economy at the same time as expanding the military. He also had to make more coins with metals which could have been used to make ammunitions, but had to give them up in order to rebuild his kingdom. He had too much stress dealing with numerous problems inside and outside of the country, and died at the early age of 39 in 1659. Although his plan for northern conquest was never put in action, many people regard him as a brilliant and brave ruler who dedicated his life to serving his nation.

Titles 

 3 July 1619 - 1623: His Excellency, Prince (군,君), junior 2nd rank 
 1623 - 1645: His Excellency, Grand Prince Bongrim (봉림대군; 邦林大君)
 1645 - 13 June 1649: His Royal Highness, the Crown Prince of Joseon (왕세자; 王世子)
 13 June 1649 - 23 June 1659: His Majesty, the King of Joseon (왕,王)

Ancestry

Family
Father: King Injo of Joseon (7 December 1595 – 17 June 1649) (조선 인조)
Grandfather: Wonjong of Joseon (2 August 1580 – 29 December 1619) (조선 원종)
Grandmother:  Queen Inheon of the Neungseong Gu clan (17 April 1578 – 14 January 1626) (인헌왕후 구씨)
Mother: Queen Inryeol of the Cheongju Han clan (16 August 1594 – 16 January 1636) (인렬왕후 한씨)
Grandfather: Han Jun-gyeom (1557–1627) (한준겸) 
Grandmother:  Lady Hwang of the Changwon Hwang clan (1561–1594) (창원 황씨) 
Consorts and their Respective Issue(s):
 Queen Inseon of the Deoksu Jang clan (9 February 1619 – 19 March 1674) (인선왕후 장씨)
 Princess Sukshin (1634 – 1645) (숙신공주), first daughter
 Princess Sukan (1636 – 1697) (숙안공주), second daughter 
 First son (대군) (? - 1642)
 Princess Sukmyeong (1640 – 17 March 1699) (숙명공주), third daughter
 Crown Prince Yi Yeon (14 March 1641 – 17 September 1674) (왕세자 연), second son
 Princess Sukhwi (17 February 1642 – 27 October 1696) (숙휘공주), fourth daughter
 Fifth daughter (공주) (? - 1644)
 Third son (대군) (1645 - 1645)
 Princess Sukjeong (13 December 1646 – 13 June 1668) (숙정공주), sixth daughter
 Princess Sukgyeong (22 February 1648 – 17 February 1671) (숙경공주), seventh daughter 
 Yi Ae-suk, Princess Uisun (1635 – 1662) (의순공주), adopted daughter
 Royal Noble Consort An of the Gyeongju Yi clan (1622 – 1693) (안빈 이씨)
 Princess Suknyeong (1649 - 1666/1668) (숙녕옹주), eight daughter
 Royal Consort Suk-ui of the Kim clan (숙의 김씨)
 Royal Consort Suk-won of the Jeong clan (숙원 정씨)

Modern depictions
Portrayed by Kim Heung-ki in the 1981 KBS1 TV Series Daemyeong.
 Portrayed by Lee In in the 2010 KBS2 TV series The Slave Hunters.
 Portrayed by Choi Deok-moon in the 2012 MBC TV series The King's Doctor. 
 Portrayed by Kim Joo-young in the 2013 JTBC TV series Blooded Palace: The War of Flowers.
Portrayed by Lee Min-ho in the 2015 MBC  TV series Splendid Politics.
 Portrayed by Yeon Woo-jin in the 2016 film Seondal: The Man Who Sells the River.

See also
List of Korean monarchs
History of Korea
Joseon dynasty

References

External links
  Manchu–Korean expedition against Russian expansion (나선정벌 (羅禪征伐)
  map of the Manchu–Korean expedition against Russian expansion (나선정벌 (羅禪征伐)
   Manchu–Korean expedition against Russian expansion (나선정벌 (羅禪征伐)
  Major problems of Russian–Korean relationship
  altaica.nm.ru
  The participation of Korean troops in the Amur river in 1654 and 1658 years

1619 births
1659 deaths
17th-century Korean monarchs